SS Colonist was a British iron-hulled coastal cargo ship driven by a 3-cylinder triple expansion steam engine. She was built in 1889 by Osbourne, Graham & Co. Ltd, North Hylton, England. She had a complement of 29 crewmembers.

Shipwrecked
On 9 September 1894, traveling from Newcastle, New South Wales on her way to Adelaide while carrying a cargo of coal the Colonist was wrecked on Newcastle's Oyster Bank at position .

References

Further reading 
Online Databases
 
 
 
Books
 Wrecks on the New South Wales Coast. By Loney, J. K. (Jack Kenneth), 1925–1995 Oceans Enterprises. 1993 .
Australian shipwrecks Vol.3 1871–1900 By Loney, J. K. (Jack Kenneth), 1925–1995. Geelong Vic: List Publishing, 1982 910.4530994 LON

1889 ships
Ships built on the River Wear
Maritime incidents in 1894
Shipwrecks of the Hunter Region
1894 in Australia
1871–1900 ships of Australia
Merchant ships of Australia
Iron and steel steamships of Australia